Lympho-epithelial Kazal-type related inhibitor 2 (LEKTI-2) is a protein encoded by the SPINK9 gene in humans. SPINK9 is a member of a gene family cluster located on chromosome 5q33.1, which includes SPINK5 and SPINK6. LEKTI-2 is an inhibitor of KLK5.

Desquamation
The outer layer of the epidermis is called the stratum corneum. In the stratum corneum terminally differentiated corneocytes are held together by corneodesmosomes. In order for desquamation to occur, corneodesmosomes need to be fully degraded. KLK5 and KLK7 are two serine proteases that degrade corneodesmosomes. LEKTI-2 regulates corneodesmosome degradation by inhibiting KLK5. In acral (palm and sole) skin, where desquamation needs to be delayed, SPINK9 expression is strongly upregulated. The resulting high level of LEKTI-2 delays corneodesmosome degradation, thereby allowing the epidermis to form a thick protective stratum corneum layer.

Clinical Significance
SPINK9 is overexpressed in lichen simplex chronicus, actinic keratosis, and squamous cell carcinoma.

See also 
Kazal-type serine protease inhibitor domain

References 

Proteins